David John Leonard (born 25 November 1965) is a former New Zealand cricketer who played for Central Districts. In 1989–90 Leonard took 10 for 133 for the Central Districts against Northern Districts in Rotorua on his first-class debut. He was born in Timaru.

In February 2020, he was named in New Zealand's squad for the Over-50s Cricket World Cup in South Africa. However, the tournament was cancelled during the third round of matches due to the coronavirus pandemic.

References

External links
CricketArchive Profile

1965 births
Living people
New Zealand cricketers
Central Districts cricketers
Cricketers from Timaru